The Battle of the Faubourg Saint Antoine occurred on 2 July 1652 during the Fronde rebellion in France. It is named after the Faubourg Saint-Antoine, a district near the Bastille in the east of Paris, where the battle took place.

Details
During the period of the Second Fronde, between 1650 and 1653, Louis, the Prince of Condé, controlled much of Paris, having allied himself with the Parliament of Paris, which was in open rebellion against the Crown. The French king, Louis XIV had only recently reached the age of majority (on 7 September 1651), and Condé still claimed that the nefarious influence of Cardinal Mazarin rendered him incapable of rule.

On 2 July 1652, the battle of the Faubourg St Antoine took place just outside the Bastille. Condé had sallied out of Paris to prevent the advance of the royalist forces under the command of Turenne. Condé's forces became trapped against the city walls and the Porte St Antoine, which the Parliament refused to open; he was coming under increasingly heavy fire from the Royalist artillery and the situation looked bleak. In a famous incident, La Grande Mademoiselle, the daughter of Gaston, the Duke of Orléans, convinced her father to issue an order for the Parisian forces to act, before she then entered the Bastille and personally ensured that the commander turned the fortress's cannon on Turenne's army, causing significant casualties and enabling Condé's army's safe withdrawal.

Later in 1652, Condé was finally forced to surrender Paris to the royalist forces in October, effectively bringing the Parisian Fronde to an end: the Bastille returned to royal control. The Fronde in the Provinces, especially around Bordeaux, however, continued through the summer of 1653, also with involvement of the Spanish fleet in the Battle of Bordeaux (1653).

References

Bibliography
Hazan, Eric. (2011) The Invention of Paris: A History in Footsteps. London: Verso. .
Le Bas, M. (1840) France. Annales historiques. Paris: F. Didot fréres. . 
Munck, Thomas. (1990) Seventeenth Century Europe: 1598-1700. London: Macmillan. .
 
Sainte-Aulaire, Louis Clair de Beaupoil Le Comte de. (1827) Histoire de la Fronde, Tome 3. Paris: Baudouin Frères. . 
Treasure, Geoffrey. (1997) Mazarin: the Crisis of Absolutism in France. London: Routledge. .

Faubourg St Antoine
Political history of the Ancien Régime
Faubourg St Antoine
Bastille
F
F
Faubourg St Antoine
The Fronde